Imprint is a 2007 independent drama/thriller film co-written and directed by Michael Linn and produced by Chris Eyre. The film is one of the only American films to feature an indigenous Native American lead role for an actress, played by Tongva-Kumeyaay actress Carmelo.

Synopsis
Shayla is an attorney working in South Dakota who in the opening convicts a young Lakota boy in a homicide. She returns to her family home on the Lakota reservation to take a break from the toll the case took on her. Once there, she begins to hear and see visions that she believes to be from her recently departed father and later becomes convinced its an ominous sign of her missing brother. She seeks help from elders and their advice leads her to confront some truths about her life and the people in it. Along the way she ends a relationship and possibly begins a new one with a local tribal officer who helps her investigate the mystery.

Cast 

Tonantzin Carmelo as Shayla
Michael Spears as Tom
Cory Brusseau as Jonathan
Carla-Rae Holland as Rebecca 
Charlie White Buffalo as Sam
Dave Bald Eagle as Medicine Man

Awards and nominations

References

External links
 Official website
 
 
 32nd American Indian Film Festival

2000s thriller films
2007 films
American independent films
Films about Native Americans
Films set in South Dakota
2000s English-language films
2000s American films